The FC Basel 1913–14 season was their twenty-first season since the club's foundation on 15 November 1893. The club's chairman was Karl Ibach, but he stood down at the AGM on 25 September 1913. From that date Carl Albert Hintermann took over as club president. FC Basel played their home games in the Landhof in the district Basel-Wettstein in Kleinbasel, Basel.

Overview 
The Englishman Percy Humphreys was the first professional trainer that the club FC Basel had ever employed. Under club chairman Karl Ibach, Humphreys signed his contract and began his duties on 1 April 1913. He had previously been head-coach for Hartlepool United in the English North Eastern League. Prior to Humphreys, it had always been the team captain who had taken over the function of the trainer.

Basel played 32 matches in their 1913–14 season. 14 of these matches were in the domestic league and 18 were friendly games. Six of these were home games, played in the Landhof, one other home game was played on the Margarethenwiese in Basel, five others were away games in Switzerland and five games were played abroad. Basel played seven matches against German teams, one against the English team Bradford City and the other ten opponents were Swiss. Of these friendlies 10 were won and 8 ended with a defeat. In these 18 games Basel scored a total of 57 goals and conceded 47.

The Swiss Serie A 1913–14 was divided into three regional groups, East, Central and West. Basel were allocated to the Central group together with local rivals Old Boys and Nordstern Basel. The other teams playing in the Central group were Young Boys, FC La Chaux-de-Fonds, Étoile-Sporting FC La Chaux-de-Fonds, FC Bern and Biel-Bienne. Basel started well into the championship winning seven of the first eight games, the first four games straight off. After the new year break things turned against them and they were defeated three times. Basel lost contact to the Young Boys at the top of the table and ended the season in joint second position with FC Bern, they were three points behind the group winners. In their 14 games Basel scored 63 goals and conceded 33. The two highest scoring games were both played against FC La Chaux-de-Fonds. Basel won the home game 11–4 and the away game 10–1.

The Young Boys continued to the finals against Cantonal Neuchatel and Aarau, who eventually won the championship in the Finals. Last place in the group bottom was Old Boys, who therefore entered the play-off round against relegation, in which they were successful.

The Anglo-Cup was not played in this year and so, Basel could not defend the title that they had obtained the year before. But memories of this cup win soon faded anyway, because in fact the competition was discontinued completely due to World War I.

Players 
Squad members

Results 

Legend

Friendly matches

Pre- and mid-season

Winter break to end of season

Serie A

Central group results

Central group league table

See also
 History of FC Basel
 List of FC Basel players
 List of FC Basel seasons

References

Sources 
 Rotblau: Jahrbuch Saison 2014/2015. Publisher: FC Basel Marketing AG. 
 Die ersten 125 Jahre. Publisher: Josef Zindel im Friedrich Reinhardt Verlag, Basel. 
 FCB team 1913–14 at fcb-archiv.ch
 Switzerland 1913-14 at RSSSF

External links
 FC Basel official site

FC Basel seasons
Basel